Maurice Bevan (10 March 1921 – 20 June 2006) was a British bass-baritone and composer, who sang with The Deller Consort (founded by Alfred Deller in 1948), St Paul's Cathedral in London, and the BBC.

References

External links
Biography on Allmusic
Discography on Discogs

British bass-baritones
British composers
1921 births
2006 deaths
20th-century British male singers